The Rural Municipality of Eyebrow No. 193 is a rural municipality (RM) in the Canadian province of Saskatchewan within Census Division No. 7 and  Division No. 2. It is located in the south-central portion of the province.

History 
The RM of Eyebrow No. 193 incorporated as a rural municipality on December 13, 1909.

Geography

Communities and localities 
The following urban municipalities are surrounded by the RM.

Villages
 Brownlee
 Eyebrow

The following unincorporated communities are within the RM.

Localities
 Darmody (dissolved as a village, December 31, 1967)
 Eskbank
 Lake Valley
 Mawer (dissolved as a village, December 31, 1967)

Demographics 

Government 
The RM of Eyebrow No. 193 is governed by an elected municipal council and an appointed administrator that meets on the second Wednesday of every month. The reeve of the RM is Michael Cavan while its administrator is Chris Bueckert. The RM's office is located in Eyebrow.

Transportation 
 Saskatchewan Highway 19
 Saskatchewan Highway 42
 Saskatchewan Highway 367
 Saskatchewan Highway 627
 Canadian Pacific Railway

References

External links 

E